Hossein Ali Anvari was an Iranian professor in electrical Engineering. He got his PhD in Electrical Engineering from Institut National des Sciences Appliquées de Toulouse. He served as the chancellor of Sharif University of Technology for a period of one year.

Education 
Hossein Ali Anvari was graduated from Alborz High School and later from College of Engineering in University of Tehran. He obtained his PhD in 1962 in Electrical Engineering from Institut National des Sciences Appliquées de Toulouse.

References

Chancellors of the Sharif University of Technology